Pure Holocaust is the second album by Norwegian black metal band Immortal. It was released on November 1, 1993, on Osmose Productions. It is generally faster sounding than its predecessor Diabolical Fullmoon Mysticism. The lyrics focus mainly on ice, snow, and fantasy landscapes. It is the first album to feature Abbath on drums.

The album was released as a standard CD, as a limited LP on Osmose Productions (which was reissued in 2005), and as a limited edition picture disc in 1998.

Track listing

Personnel
Immortal
Abbath Doom Occulta – vocals, bass, drums
Demonaz Doom Occulta – guitar

Note
Grim is credited for drums on the album and appears on the cover, however, drums were played by Abbath.

References

External links
 Official website
 Immortal Discography
 Encyclopaedia Metallum

1993 albums
Immortal (band) albums